Uncle Buck is an American single-camera comedy television series based on the 1989 film of the same name that debuted on ABC as an entry in the 2015–16 television season. The series was created for television by Steven Cragg and Brian Bradley. The show was picked up to series on May 8, 2015 and aired from June 14 to August 2, 2016.

ABC cancelled the series after one season on July 6.

Cast and characters
 Mike Epps as Buck Russell
 Nia Long as Alexis Smith-Russell
 James Lesure as Will Russell
 Iman Benson as Tia Russell
 Sayeed Shahidi as Miles Russell
 Aalyrah Caldwell as Maizy Russell

Reception
Uncle Buck received generally negative reviews from critics. On Rotten Tomatoes, the series holds an approval rating of 30%, based on 20 critics, with an average rating of 4.28/10. The site's critical consensus reads: "Despite the efforts of a charming cast, Uncle Buck is a painfully predictable adaptation without enough laughs". On Metacritic, the series has a score of 37 out of 100, based on 15 critics, indicating "generally unfavorable reviews".

Episodes

References

External links
 

Uncle Buck (franchise)
2016 American television series debuts
2016 American television series endings
2010s American black sitcoms
American Broadcasting Company original programming
English-language television shows
Live action television shows based on films
Television series by ABC Studios
Television series by Universal Television
Television series reboots
Television shows set in Chicago
Will Packer Productions television shows
2010s American single-camera sitcoms